is a vertical scrolling shooter and the 14.3rd official game of the Touhou Project series. It was first released in the 11th Hakurei Shrine Reitaisai on May 11, 2014.  It released on Steam on April 1, 2019. The player controls Seija Kijin, the main character, to take down bosses and avoid the bullets. Because in this game, the bullets are almost too dense to avoid directly, the player must use a series of 9 cheat items which belong to other characters of Touhou Project to finish the avoidance. All levels in Impossible Spell Card may be completed without the use of items, however.

Gold Rush

On November 16, 2014, ZUN released Danmaku Amanojaku ~ Gold Rush (弾幕アマノジャク　ゴールドラッシュ), a single-stage mini game based on Impossible Spell Card where Seija Kijin uses a tenth cheat item that can turn bullets into money. It was made under 2 days specifically for the Digital Game Expo 2014's "Doujin Shooting Game Caravan" contest, where it was available to be played.

References

External links 
 Impossible Spell Card on Touhou Wiki

2014 video games
Touhou Project games
Video games developed in Japan
Windows games
Windows-only games
Vertically scrolling shooters